Bailleul-Neuville is a commune in the Seine-Maritime department in the Normandy region in northern France.

Geography

Population

Places of interest
 The church of St. Waast, dating from the eleventh century.
 The church of Notre-Dame at Neuville, dating from the twelfth century.
 The château de Bailleul.

See also
Communes of the Seine-Maritime department

References

Communes of Seine-Maritime